In the motion picture industry, a star vehicle (or simply vehicle) is a film written or produced for a specific star, regardless of whether the motive is to further their career or simply to profit from their current popularity. It is designed to optimally display that star's particular talents or personal appeal. The term is also applied to stage plays and television programs. In some cases, a performer may produce their own star vehicle as self-promotion or a vanity project.

Richard Dyer, who extensively studied the phenomenon of movie stars, defined the vehicle phenomenon in his 1979 book Stars:

Under the old studio system, vehicles were sometimes created for a promising young, inexperienced, or imported actor who had signed a long-term contract with a major studio. By showcasing that actor's talents, the vehicle was an attempt to create another bankable star bound to the studio until their contract expired. Vehicles were created for rising or established stars as diverse as Fred Astaire, Joan Crawford, the Marx Brothers and Elvis Presley. In some cases, audiences could be depended on to buy tickets to a succession of a favorite star's vehicles regardless of their plots or even their overall quality, as long as care was taken to present that star well.

With the demise of the studio system, star vehicles are less common in the movie business, although they continue to appear occasionally (e.g. Julia Roberts in Pretty Woman, The Rock's The Scorpion King, or more recently Miley Cyrus' The Last Song). They remain common in television, where sitcoms routinely function as vehicles for stand-up comedians. Welcome Back, Kotter, The Cosby Show, Roseanne, Seinfeld, Home Improvement, Martin, George Lopez, Everybody Loves Raymond, Everybody Hates Chris, and The Bernie Mac Show are some notable examples from the US.

Musicals and music-themed films have commonly used the star vehicle format to capitalize on the popularity of their performer. Among the earliest examples is The Jazz Singer (1927), which drew on the popularity of Al Jolson. Elvis Presley was perhaps the most prolific star vehicle performer, featured in 25 films between 1956 and 1969. While Presley's films were a commercial success, they mostly failed to attract critical acclaim, being made primarily as a platform for his musical performances. On the other hand, Frank Sinatra is noted as a performer whose filmography strengthened his musical popularity and critical credibility. Although his first leading-role film, Meet Danny Wilson (1952), was a bland star-vehicle platform, his acting career reached a turnaround in the non-musical From Here to Eternity (1953), from which he went on to make over 40 musical and non-musical films.

References

Cinema of the United States